Philip Galanes (born October 4, 1962, in New York City) is an American writer and attorney.

Life and career
Galanes grew up in the readership area of the Brattleboro Reformer, from which he read to his family the "Dear Abby" family-advice column six days a week in his self-appointed roles as the "family fixer".

Galanes received his B.A. and J.D. degrees from Yale College and Yale Law School, and then  worked at Paul Weiss Rifkind Wharton and Garrison and Debevoise and Plimpton. He has also been employed by Golden Books Family Entertainment, the children's book publishing and media company.

Galanes' father died of a self-inflicted gunshot when Galanes was 23, a fact that Galanes kept secret for a decade while substituting fictional causes of his father's death.

Galanes has published two novels: Father's Day, published in 2004 (Alfred A. Knopf), and Emma's Table, published in 2008 (HarperCollins). He is included in Contemporary Authors, Volume 231, 2005, and Contemporary Authors New Revision Series, Volume 196, 2010. Writing Father's Day was a step in Galanes coming to terms with his father's death.

Galanes currently writes the modern-day advice column "Social Q's", which appears weekly in the New York Times Sunday Styles section. The column came about when a Times editor who read one of Galanes's novels proposed he try the new medium.
 
Some of Galanes's essays from the column were published as the book Social Q's: How to Survive the Quirks, Quandaries, and Quagmires of Today. New York, NY: Simon & Schuster, 2011 .  As characterized by radio interviewer Terry Gross, the essays "offers advice on how to handle difficult social situations at work and at home, as well as how to deal with new etiquette questions relating to texting, email and social media". Galanes also monitors the "Social Q's" group on Facebook, where members discuss current topics.

Media appearances 
Galanes frequently appears on television in connection with his column. He has been interviewed on The Gayle King Show, The Ellen DeGeneres Show, and Plum TV. He appears regularly on Today with Hoda Kotb and Kathie Lee Gifford. Galanes has also been on a number of NPR programs.

References

External links
 Philip Galanes's official website

21st-century American novelists
Living people
American columnists
American lawyers
American male novelists
Yale Law School alumni
1962 births
Paul, Weiss, Rifkind, Wharton & Garrison people
21st-century American male writers
21st-century American non-fiction writers
American male non-fiction writers
Yale College alumni